Zephnia Comstock Farmhouse is a historic home located at Cazenovia in Madison County, New York.  It is a two-story, five-bay, rectangular frame structure with a gable roof built about 1830 in the Federal style. Also on the property is a late 19th-century barn.

It was added to the National Register of Historic Places in 1987.

References

Houses on the National Register of Historic Places in New York (state)
Federal architecture in New York (state)
Houses completed in 1830
Houses in Madison County, New York
1830 establishments in New York (state)
National Register of Historic Places in Cazenovia, New York